Abd al-Samad Khan (died 1737) was the Mughal Empire's subahdar of Lahore Subah from 1713 to 1726. He was appointed by the Mughal emperor Farrukhsiyar. He was descended from the Ansari family of Panipat.
He was succeeded as governor of Punjab by his son Zakariya Khan Bahadur. He also had one daughter named Sharaf un Nisa.

Wars
During his tenure as viceroy he fought many wars with the Sikh army and captured Banda Singh Bahadur in the Battle of Gurdas Nangal. Abdus Samad Khan's Lahore army consisted of Kharal, Bhatti and Wattu tribes.

In March 1715, the army, under the rule of Abd al-Samad Khan, drove Banda Bahadur and the Sikh forces into the village of Gurdas Nangal, Gurdaspur, Punjab and laid siege to the village. but on 7 December 1715 the Mughals broke into the garrison and captured Banda Singh and his companions.

See also
Farrukhsiyar
Massa Ranghar

References

Mughal nobility
History of Lahore
18th-century viceregal rulers
1737 deaths
Year of birth unknown